Cannons Creek is a small foreshore town near the top of Western Port Bay in Victoria, Australia, 54 km south-east of Melbourne's Central Business District, located within the City of Casey local government area. Cannons Creek recorded a population of 650 at the 2021 census.

The townships of both Warneet and Blind Bight are south of Cannons Creek. The community centre is located on Cannons Creek Road.

See also
 City of Cranbourne – Cannons Creek was previously within this former local government area.

References

Western Port
Towns in Victoria (Australia)
Coastal towns in Victoria (Australia)
City of Casey